Sanguinograptis obtrecator is a species of moth of the family Tortricidae. It is found in Nigeria.

The length of the forewings is about 4 mm. The ground colour of the forewings is grey and the costal and terminal pattern is orange and brown spots along the costa. There is also a red pattern. The hindwings are brownish grey.

References

Endemic fauna of Nigeria
Moths described in 1981
Tortricini